The New Democratic Party Socialist Caucus is an unofficial left-wing faction within Canada's New Democratic Party.

Its manifesto maintains that the New Democratic Party has moved too far to the right, and is in danger of becoming indistinguishable from the Liberal Party. Consequently, the Socialist Caucus also opposed Tony Blair's Third Way policies and their adoption by the NDP because they "[leave] the basic class and economic structures of capitalism unchanged."

Origins
The Socialist Caucus was founded in early 1998 in Toronto by Barry Weisleder, Joe Flexer, Sean Cain, Jorge Hurtado and other political activists who had been involved in Peter Kormos's unsuccessful 1996 campaign to lead the Ontario New Democratic Party. It soon had branches in Ontario, Alberta and British Columbia, as well as supporters in Manitoba, Quebec and Nova Scotia. It is now active primarily in Ontario at the federal and provincial levels. It also has supporters in other provinces.
 
The caucus views itself as the successor to The Waffle of the 1960s and 1970s and a number of members in the Socialist Caucus were also in the NDP's Left Caucus and the Campaign for an Activist Party or CAP of the 1980s.

The Trotskyist group Socialist Action plays a "leading role" in the Socialist Caucus.

An earlier group called the Socialist Caucus was formed around 1959 and 1960 in Vancouver by a group of Co-operative Commonwealth Federation dissidents, "communists, Trotskyists, and fellow travellers" led by former CCF Member of Parliament Rod Young, and was involved in the CCF and then the NDP. The group published a journal called Press and then Socialist Caucus Bulletin, which was co-edited by Ernie Tate. The group eventually had branches in Alberta, Saskatchewan, Ontario, and Quebec and eventually folded into The Waffle.

Policies
The group is a socialist faction and advocates economic democracy and workers' control, full employment, the nationalization of large industries and the eradication of poverty and homelessness.

The caucus is anti-imperialist, and condemns many of the actions of the United States' government. It supports the Cuban Revolution, the withdrawal of Canada from the North Atlantic Treaty Organization (NATO) and North American Aerospace Defense Command (NORAD), the independence of Quebec, and opposes Zionism.

Leadership campaigns
In 2001, the Socialist Caucus ran Marcel Hatch in a leadership challenge against Alexa McDonough. Hatch won 120 votes out of 765 ballots cast. Bev Meslo was the Socialist Caucus' candidate in the party's 2003 leadership election, winning 1.1% of the vote in the party's first One Member One Vote leadership election, which was won by Jack Layton.

After an unsuccessful attempt to draft Peter Kormos to run for the leadership of the Ontario NDP, the Socialist Caucus endorsed Michael Prue leading up to the 2009 ONDP leadership election.

In the 2012 and 2017 NDP leadership elections, the Socialist Caucus endorsed Niki Ashton, on the latter occasion after leading an unsuccessful effort to draft former Ontario Federation of Labour president Sid Ryan as a candidate.

Other activities
In 2011, the Socialist Caucus proposed resolutions at that year's federal NDP convention to oppose the Alberta oil sands, legalize marijuana, boycott apartheid Israel, repeal the Clarity Act, and nationalize auto, bank and insurance companies. In the wake of the NDP's breakthrough in the 2011 federal election in which they won over 100 seats and formed Official Opposition in the House of Commons for the first time, Socialist Caucus chair Barry Weisleder told The Globe and Mail that "the election on May 2 sent a very clear message: the voters rejected the Liberal Party and the NDP should not strive to become a substitute Liberal Party. That’s the road to ruin", adding that "To survive, the NDP has to turn left and offer Canadians and in particular working people, an alternative to the corporate agenda." The faction also opposed a motion to remove the phrase "democratic socialism" from the preamble of the NDP's constitution and supported an unsuccessful resolution to bar the NDP from considering merger with the Liberal Party of Canada. None of the resolutions proposed by the Socialist Caucus received enough support to reach the floor of the convention for debate.

The Socialist Caucus publishes a newspaper named Turn Left, edited by Sean Cain, for each federal and Ontario provincial NDP convention. Beginning with the 2011 NDP convention issue, the publication took the form of a magazine.

In September 2011, caucus chair Barry Weisleder won the nomination to be the Ontario NDP's candidate in Thornhill in the 2011 provincial election. Within 48 hours, the party's provincial secretary rescinded the nomination without explanation.

The Socialist Caucus opposed moves by the NDP at the 2011 and 2013 federal conventions to rewrite the preamble of the party's constitution in order to remove its commitment to socialism.

The Socialist Caucus in the Ontario New Democratic Party criticized Andrea Horwath's conduct of the party's campaign in the 2014 provincial election and unsuccessfully called for a review of her leadership at the party's subsequent convention in November 2014.

During the 2015 federal election, caucus leader Barry Weisleder was outspoken in his criticisms of the party's platform and campaign, claiming that the party had moved to the right under leader Tom Mulcair. Weisleder told the National Post that the party under Mulcair had undergone "a continuation of the movement towards conservative policies. It remains a party linked to working people and the working-class organizations in the country. But its leadership and the policies of that leadership continue to embrace the capitalist order." Subsequently, the Socialist Caucus called for the removal of Mulcair as party leader and supported a leadership review at the NDP convention held in April 2016 in Edmonton.

References

External links
 
New Democratic Party Socialist Caucus - Canadian Political Parties and Political Interest Groups - Web Archive created by the University of Toronto Libraries

1998 establishments in Canada
Political movements in Canada
Socialist parties in Canada
New Democratic Party (Canada)
Political party factions in Canada